Gerald Davies (born 29 January 1949) is an Australian former cricketer. He played one first-class match for Tasmania in 1974/75.

See also
 List of Tasmanian representative cricketers

References

External links
 

1949 births
Living people
Australian cricketers
Tasmania cricketers
People from Cinderford
Sportspeople from Gloucestershire